The Stern Grove Festival is an admission-free series of performing arts events held during the summer months in San Francisco. Established in 1938, the festival is held at Sigmund Stern Grove, a eucalyptus-wooded natural amphitheater on a  site about two miles (three kilometers) south of Golden Gate Park that ranges from 19th Avenue and Sloat Boulevard west to 34th Avenue.

This festival went on hiatus in 194245 due to World War II and in 2020 due to COVID-19.

Background
Early plans for the Grove as a musical venue in the 1930s focused on maintaining the natural contour of the amphitheater bowl, with the surrounding garden, grassy slopes, and eucalyptus trees emphasizing the nature-oriented feel as a venue. Rosalie M. Stern saw the area's potential “because of its peaceful beauty, its historic interest, and, being below sea level, it is shielded from cold winds and fogs.” The Sigmund Stern Memorial Grove was dedicated June 4, 1932, and the first open air symphony concert was held two weeks later.

History
The first summer concert of the first annual Stern Grove Festival was held on July 10, 1938 and performed by the Bay Region Symphony of the Federal Music Project. In 1943, the San Francisco Ballet performed at the Stern Grove Festival for the first time and has since become a staple in the summer season lineup.

In 1963, during the 25th Anniversary Season, the San Francisco Symphony performed; the photographer Ansel Adams was in attendance and took a series of photographs of the grove. Three years later, in 1966, the Festival had its first ever jazz concert, with Turk Murphy, John Handy, and Vince Guaraldi performing; the concert was taped and televised nationally on the Bell Telephone Hour. In 1980, a documentary about Stern Grove aired on PBS stations across the country. 

Renovations on the Sigmund Stern Grove began in 2004 and were completed in time for the opening of its 68th season in June 2005. In May 2020, the Stern Grove Festival was canceled for the first time since World War II due to the COVID-19 pandemic; however, a TV special entitled "Best of Fest" was aired using archival footage of the festival and attracted more than half a million viewers.

Notable acts 

Some notable acts who have performed at the Stern Grove Festival have included: Leann Rhymes (2022), The Isley Brothers (2019), Ziggy Marley (2018), Kool & the Gang (2017), Janelle Monae (2016), Julieta Venegas (2016), Randy Newman (2015), Talib Kweli (2015), Smokey Robinson (2014), Michael McDonald (2013), Anita Baker (2012), and Roberta Flack (2009).

Digital 

Stern Grove Festival's YouTube channel features concert videos and pre-concert talks that began with the 2006 Stern Grove Festival season.

References

External links

 
 Official history of Stern Grove Festival performances (1970–present)
 Video tour of park and amphitheater

Culture of San Francisco
Festivals in the San Francisco Bay Area
Music of the San Francisco Bay Area
Summer festivals
Sunset District, San Francisco
Recurring events established in 1938
1938 establishments in California
Festivals established in 1938
Music festivals established in 1938